Right Now is an album by former Furious Five members, Grandmaster Melle Mel and Scorpio.  The album was released on April 8, 1997 for Str8 Game Records and was produced by Melle Mel and Scorpio.  The album was a critical and commercial failure and did not make it to the billboard charts.  Two singles were released "Mama" and "Mr. Big Stuff" but neither of the two made it the billboard charts either.

The European release had the interview snippets removed and the track listing altered. The front and rear artwork was also reversed.

Track listing

US version (Str8 Game Records, STG 1204-2)
"Intro" – 0:27
"On The Down Low" – 3:04
"Interview" – 0:28
"Mama" – 4:28
"Interview" – 0:34
"If..." – 5:22
"Interview" – 0:26
"Right Now" – 4:46
"Interview" – 0:35
"When You Lose A Child" – 4:51
"Interview" – 0:25
"China White" – 3:19
"Interview" – 0:24
"Broke Ass Niggas" – 3:54
"Interview" – 0:10
"Smackin' Rappers" – 3:31
"Interview" – 0:28
"New York – L.A." – 4:33
"Interview" – 0:29
"Stupid Mutha Fuckas" – 3:39
"Interview" – 0:25
"Sex You..." – 3:52
"Interview" – 0:20
"Mr. Big Stuff" – 3:32

European version (Str8 Game Records / EDEL, 0098862RAP)
"Stupid Mutha Fuckas" – 3:39
"Mama" – 4:28
"If..." – 5:22
"Right Now" – 4:46
"When You Lose A Child" – 4:51
"China White" – 3:19
"Broke Ass Niggas" – 3:54
"Smackin' Rappers" – 3:31
"New York – L.A." – 4:33
"On The Down Low" – 3:04
"Sex You..." – 3:52
"Mr. Big Stuff" – 3:32

Notes
"China White" is a re-recorded version of "White Lines (Don't Do It)."

References

Melle Mel albums
1997 albums